Dorilus Morrison (December 27, 1814 – June 26, 1897) was an American banker, businessman, and Republican politician.  He was the first and third Mayor of Minneapolis and was a member of the Minnesota Senate.

Life and career
Morrison was born in Livermore, Maine. His first business was as a merchant supporting the lumber industry near Bangor, Maine. In 1854, Morrison visited Minnesota to investigate potential lumber interests. He was sufficiently impressed that he sold his businesses in Maine and moved to St. Anthony, Minnesota within a year. He became involved in the local lumber and milling industries (along with his fellow Mainer William D. Washburn) and became an early investor in the Minneapolis Milling Company (forerunner of today's General Mills).

In 1863, Morrison was elected to represent the 5th district in the Minnesota State Senate and served from 1864 to 1865. When the city of Minneapolis was formally incorporated in 1867, Morrison was elected as its first mayor. He was re-elected to a second term in 1869 and ran unsuccessfully for a third in 1872.

Morrison supported the initial construction of the Northern Pacific Railroad along with William Washburn, George A. Brackett, William S. King and others. When the Northwestern National Bank of Minneapolis was chartered in 1872, Morrison was its first president. Around that same time, he began building a streetcar line in the city.  He joined with other businessmen, and eventually hired Thomas Lowry, who got the line up and running in 1875.  The line eventually merged with a line in neighboring St. Paul to become Twin City Rapid Transit.

Morrison died in 1897. He is buried at Lakewood Cemetery in Minneapolis.

Electoral history
Minneapolis Mayoral Election, 1867
Dorilus Morrison
Minneapolis Mayoral Election, 1869
Dorilus Morrison 859
Henry G. Sidle 756
Minneapolis Mayoral Election, 1872
Eugene McLanahan Wilson 2,208	
Dorilus Morrison 1,534

Notes
No specific record of the vote exists, only the result.

References

1814 births
1897 deaths
Mayors of Minneapolis
Republican Party Minnesota state senators
People from Livermore, Maine
Politicians from Bangor, Maine
Washburn family
Burials at Lakewood Cemetery
19th-century American politicians